Lindsey Elizabeth Wright (born 31 December 1979) is an Australian professional golfer playing on the LPGA Tour. She earned exempt status for the 2004 LPGA season in 2003, and has been competing full-time on the Tour since.

Personal life
Wright was born in Tunbridge Wells, Kent, England and currently holds residence in both McKinney, Texas and Albury, Australia.
Lindsay who is also a qualified registered nurse has been working as a full time nurse after the prime of her career since 2018.

Amateur career
Wright took up golf at the age of nine. She was an Australian Institute of Sport golf scholarship holder from 1998 to 1999. She finished second at the 2001 NCAA Championship while at Pepperdine University. She was a semifinalist at the 2002 U.S. Women's Amateur, finished second at the 2002 World Cup in Malaysia and was a finalist at the 2002 British Ladies Amateur. She played in the 2003 Kraft Nabisco Championship as an amateur and tied for 57th.

Other amateur victories and honours
1998 Leading amateur at the Women's Australian Open
1998–1999 AIS Scholarship Holder
1998–1999 Victorian State Team Representative
1999 Won AIS Golf Coaches Award (awarded by the head coach for performance/effort)
2000–2003 Pepperdine University (Sports Administration Degree) 4 Time All-American
2003 NCAA Women's Team Championship runner-up while at Pepperdine University

Professional career
In 2003, Wright turned professional in June and competed on the Futures Tour, where she won the GE FUTURES Professional Golf Classic. She tied for 54th at the LPGA Final Qualifying Tournament to earn non-exempt status for the 2004 LPGA season. In 2004, she competed on the Futures Tour, where she won the Bank of Ann Arbor FUTURES Golf Classic and finished second on the money list to earn exempt status for the 2005 LPGA season. In 2005, she recorded a season-best tie for fifth at the Longs Drugs Challenge. In 2006, she recorded a season-best tie for sixth at the CN Canadian Women's Open and carded a career-low 66 during the second round of the Fields Open in Hawaii, where she tied for ninth.

Wright recorded a career-best finish at the McDonald's LPGA Championship, where she finished fourth and tied her career-low 66 in the final round. She also tied for fifth at the Wegmans LPGA and at the HSBC Women's World Match Play Championship.

Professional wins (5)

Futures Tour wins (3)

LPGA Tour playoff record (0–1)

ALPG Tour wins (2)
2004 Catalina Country Club Pro-Am
2012 ISPS Handa New Zealand Women's Open (co-sanctioned with Ladies European Tour)

Results in LPGA majors
Results not in chronological order before 2014.

^ The Evian Championship was added as a major in 2013.

CUT = missed the half-way cut
"T" = tied

Summary

Most consecutive cuts made – 5 (2006 LPGA – 2007 LPGA)
Longest streak of top-10s – 2 (2009 Kraft Nabisco – 2008 LPGA)

Team appearances
Amateur
Espirito Santo Trophy (representing Australia): 2000, 2002 (winners)
Commonwealth Trophy (representing Australia): 1999 (winners)
Tasman Cup (representing Australia): 1999 (winners)

Professional
World Cup (representing Australia): 2007, 2008
International Crown (representing Australia): 2014
The Queens (representing Australia): 2015

References

External links

Australian female golfers
Pepperdine Waves women's golfers
LPGA Tour golfers
ALPG Tour golfers
Australian Institute of Sport golfers
People from Royal Tunbridge Wells
1979 births
Living people